James Duncan  (1756 – June 24, 1844) was a member of the United States House of Representatives from Pennsylvania.

James Duncan born in Philadelphia, Pennsylvania.  He attended the common schools and Princeton College.  He served as the first prothonotary of Adams County, Pennsylvania.  During the American Revolutionary War he was appointed as a lieutenant in Colonel Moses Hazen’s 2nd Canadian Regiment on November 3, 1776, and on March 25, 1778, was promoted to captain.

Duncan was elected as a Democratic-Republican to the Seventeenth Congress but resigned before Congress assembled.  He died in Mercer County, Pennsylvania.

References

The Political Graveyard

1756 births
1844 deaths
People of colonial Pennsylvania
People of Pennsylvania in the American Revolution
Politicians from Philadelphia
Continental Army officers from Canada
Princeton University alumni
Pennsylvania prothonotaries
Democratic-Republican Party members of the United States House of Representatives from Pennsylvania